Nicholas Frank Bolkovac (March 20, 1928 – October 29, 2015) was an American football offensive and defensive tackle in the National Football League for the Pittsburgh Steelers.  He played college football at the University of Pittsburgh and was drafted in the 30th round of the 1951 NFL Draft by the Washington Redskins. He founded the "Pitt Rocks", an alumni organization for Pitt football players who played between 1940 and 1960. He died from "lung complications" in 2015.

References

1928 births
2015 deaths
People from McKees Rocks, Pennsylvania
Players of American football from Pennsylvania
American football defensive tackles
American football offensive tackles
Pittsburgh Panthers football players
Pittsburgh Steelers players